AS Samaritaine is a football club of Martinique, based in the northeastern town Sainte-Marie.

Founded in 1920, their home games are staged at their Xercès-Louis stadium, which is named after a Martinique-born French international footballer of the 1950s, Xercès Louis.

In 2009, the club were relegated due to financial problems. The club eventually won promotion back to the top division and are the current league champions, having won the title during the 2019–20 season.

Honours
Martinique Championnat National
Champions: 1974–75, 1980–81, 2019–20.

Coupe de Martinique
Winners: 2017.

Trophée du Conseil Général
Winners: 2000, 2020.

Ligue des Antilles
Winners: 2009.

References

External links
 2007/2008 Club info -Antilles-Foot
 Club info – French Football Federation

Football clubs in Martinique
Association football clubs established in 1920
AS Samaritaine